Beqabu is a 1996 Indian Hindi romantic film produced and directed by N. Chandra, starring Sanjay Kapoor and Mamta Kulkarni.

Cast

 Ashok Kumar as Daadu Raja's ustaad 
 Sanjay Kapoor as Raja alias Ronnie Verma
 Mamta Kulkarni as Reshmi Kapoor
 Amrish Puri as ACP Amritlal Bakshi
 Himani Shivpuri as Aarti Kapoor
 Mohan Kapoor as Zanjhar Singh
 Anjan Srivastav as Dayal Verma
 Dilip Prabhavalkar as Behrupiya Raja's Friend
 John Gabriel as Gadhulla Pathan Terrorist
 Brownie as Head Terrorist
 Rana Jung Bahadur as Hotel Owner 
 Guddi Maruti as Rashmi's Friend
Dinesh Hingoo as Bank Manager

Synopsis
A terrorist gang is being trained in the forest area outside India, where a deal is being fixed with Zanjhar Singh to create chaos in India so that they succeed in refraining overseas investors from starting business ventures in India.  Raja who is imprisoned is being taken to the court in a police jeep. On the way, he is shot by ACP Amritlal Bakshi and certain terrorists. Struck by a few bullets in the encounter, Raja dies. Reshmi's father plans to get her married. However, she prefers to stay home as the widow of Raja. In order to overcome the loneliness, Reshmi's father sends her to Nepal for a trip along with her friends. On reaching Kathmandu, she finds a lookalike of Raja there. Though he tells that he is Ronnie, employed as a hotel singer over there, Reshmi has doubts and she almost confirmed that it is Raja. After a music play in the hotel, she asks him in front of the audience to display his left chest where Raja was hit by the bullet during the encounter in which he was killed. Ronnie displays his left chest and Reshmi feels embarrassed when she sees that there is no mark of any injury on his left chest. Unable to bear the humiliation in front of the crowd, she jumps from the top of the building and gets seriously injured.

The hotel owner gets confused over the incidents and enquires Ronnie about the incident. Rony reveals his past. Along with his Ustaad and Behrupriya, Ronnie, alias Raja cleverly loots a bank by fooling the manager. Just when they were about to take leave with the looted money, the terrorist gang led by Zanjhar attacks the bank. Much to his astonishment, Zanjhar finds that the bank manager is tied up in the locker and all the safes were looted. Irritated on seeing this, Zanjhar fires at everyone in his way and asks for money. Raja throws the briefcase with money to Zanjhar, and they take leave. Highly dejected after their plan's failure, Daadu, Raja and Behrupiya script a tale and cleverly gets the money bag back from Zanjhar's colleague. Zanjhar is unhappy with this and they trace out Daadu's whereabouts and kill him. They follow Raja, and while he gets shot, a visitor Dayal Verma saves Raja and is admitted to hospital. ACP Amritlal Bakshi visits Raja in the hospital and assures him of a safe residence if he assists police in trapping Zanjhar. Dayal Verma secretly reveals to ACP that he is the biological father of Raja and he had abandoned them long ago owing to a misunderstanding. Now he has realised the mistake and hence saved his son from gunpoint. He also informs that by his influence he will somehow get a job for Raja at his master's house, where he is now employed as a driver, and also install cultural values in his son, which is desperately missing in him now.

In the meantime, Dayal Verma's master accidentally drove his car over a few people who were sleeping by the roadside at night. He is about to be caught by police when Dayal insists that he will bear the crime on his head and go to jail. In return, they had to employ his son in their house, to which they agree. Raja and Behrupiya stay in the master's house. Reshmi, the master's daughter fells in love with Raja. In the meanwhile, Raja helps police to catch Zanjhar. However, things get worse as Reshmi's family is against the love affair. Raja elopes with Reshmi and they secretly get married. However, terrorists find them and Reshmi gets shot. She gets admitted in hospital and Raja comes to visit her when her mother stops him. However, when the nurse tells her to present Raja in front of her, Raja goes to see her despite an obstructing Reshmi's mother and other hospital staff. Raja is then arrested and put to jail for creating an issue in hospital.

In jail, ACP Amritlal Bakshi reveals a new plan to "kill" Raja to escape from the terrorists. For this, he wore bullet proof vest & putted red colour patches & was shot with bullets on the way to court and he fell down dead in front of the crowd. Then Raja leaves for Nepal and disguises himself as Ronnie, the hotel singer.

Now, since Reshmi is again unconscious, Ronnie reveals himself as Raja. In the meantime, Zanjhar, who is in jail identifies Dayal Verma in the same jail as Raja's father. Dayal Verma who was to be released the next day, reveals to Zanjhar that after his release he plans to stay with his son, who is alive in Nepal. That night Zanjhar breaks the jail and escapes taking Dayal along with him. ACP Amritlal Bakshi sets to find out Zanjhar & locates Zanjhar at Marfah village along with Raja & in the Voilantic Climax, Raja kills Zanjhar by burning him down.

Soundtrack

References

External links

1996 films
1990s Hindi-language films
Films directed by N. Chandra
Films scored by Anu Malik
Films set in Nepal
Films shot in Nepal
Films shot in Kathmandu